Red Christmas is a 2016 Australian horror film written, directed, and produced by Craig Anderson.

Plot

A family gathers together to celebrate Christmas. Amidst the celebrations, a mysterious, cloaked stranger, "Cletus" arrives the house and is taken in. Due to his strange behaviour, he is eventually forced to leave.

It is eventually revealed that 20 years ago, the matriarch of the family, Diane (Dee Wallace), travelled north to have an abortion. During the procedure, a religious fanatic bombed the clinic and took Diane's planned to be aborted child, Cletus. Cletus has now returned to the family home to violently exact revenge on her entire family.

During the night, Cletus kills Hope with an ax, and proceeds to strangle Joe in a car. Cletus smashes Scott's head. A police officer eventually arrives after being called earlier, unfortunately Cletus murders him almost immediately. Later on, Cletus forces Peter's head into a blender. Diane accidentally shoots Jerry. Ginny gives birth to the baby. Cletus stabs Suzy with an umbrella. Cletus stabs Ginny in the back and gently rests her newborn baby onto a table. Diane stabs Cletus with an anchor chained around her neck, then leaps out the window of the second-floor room, hanging herself and ripping out Cletus' insides, leaving Ginny's newborn baby as the sole survivor of the night.

Cast
 Dee Wallace as Diane
 Geoff Morrell as Joe
 Sarah Bishop as Suzy
 David Collins as Peter
 Janis McGavin as Ginny
 Sam Campbell as Cletus
Deelia Meriel as Hope
Gerard Odwyer as Jerry
Bjorn Stewart as Scott

Reception
On Metacritic, which assigns a rating to reviews, the film has a weighted average score of 52 out of 100, based on 5 critics, indicating "mixed or average reviews".

Eddie Cockrell from Variety called it, "An energetic, candy-colored romp through genre tropes that manages to take its subject matter seriously while poking fun at itself at the same time." Noel Murray from Los Angeles Times wrote in his review on the film, "Red Christmas doesn't have any specific political point of view; it's fraught with contradictions, and should make anyone squeamish. Mostly, it's a tightly constructed, unapologetically nasty little thriller, given depth and weight by Wallace's interpretation of a sweet woman suffering for her past." John DeFore called the film "Gory and offensive, but lacking in the scare department.". DeFore criticized the film's pacing, and lack of humor.

Craig Anderson also made a 100-minute making of documentary, Horror Movie: A Low Budget Nightmare.

References

External links
 
 
 

2016 films
2016 horror films
Australian horror films
Australian Christmas films
2010s Christmas horror films
Fiction about familicide
Films set in Australia
Australian films about revenge
Films about mass murder
2010s English-language films
2010s Australian films